Hugh Burns (born 13 December 1965) is a Scottish former professional football player who is best known for his time with Rangers and Kilmarnock.

Club career
Burns began his career with Cambuslang Rangers before joining Rangers. Whilst at Ibrox he made over fifty appearances in the league and played both legs in a UEFA Cup game against CA Osasuna in 1985. He signed for Hamilton Academical on loan the following season then moved on to Heart of Midlothian in 1987.

He had spells at Dunfermline Athletic, Fulham (at that time in the third tier in England) and second spell with Hamilton Academical. In 1991, he joined Kilmarnock and made over forty appearances, then switched to Ayrshire rivals Ayr United. A two-year spell at Somerset Park saw him play over sixty games before winding down his career with Dumbarton. He then moved back to the Junior leagues with Larkhall Thistle.

Media work
Burns is a pundit on the Talking Football programme on Rock Sport Radio.

References

External links

1965 births
Living people
Rangers F.C. players
Hamilton Academical F.C. players
Ayr United F.C. players
Dunfermline Athletic F.C. players
Association football defenders
Arbroath F.C. players
Fulham F.C. players
Kilmarnock F.C. players
Dumbarton F.C. players
Heart of Midlothian F.C. players
Scottish Football League players
Scottish Junior Football Association players
Scottish footballers
Cambuslang Rangers F.C. players
Larkhall Thistle F.C. players
Scotland under-21 international footballers